Salman Haidar is a former Indian diplomat who served as the Foreign Secretary of India. His tenure was from 1 March 1995 to 30 June 1997.  He also served as high commissioner of India to the United Kingdom from January to July, 1998.

Personal life
Haidar graduated from Sherwood College, Nainital, St. Stephen’s College, Delhi and Cambridge University. He has a son, Nadeem Haidar (SOAS alumnus) and a daughter, Navina Najat Haidar, author and art curator at the Metropolitan Museum of Art, New York. Nadeem Haidar is married to Suhasini Haidar, daughter of BJP politician Subramanian Swamy. Suhasini Haidar is a well known journalist and former CNN-IBN anchor.

References

Indian Foreign Secretaries
Living people
High Commissioners of India to the United Kingdom
1937 births
Ambassadors of India to Bhutan
Ambassadors of India to China